Williams Grove is a historic home located at Berlin, Maryland, United States.

Williams Grove may also refer to:
 Williams Grove, Pennsylvania
 Williams Grove School, North Carolina

See also
 William Grove (disambiguation)
 William Groves (disambiguation)